Guraletschsee is a lake above Vals in the canton of Grisons, Switzerland. The lake lies entirely on territory of the municipality of Vals.

The water from the lake runs down north and is suspected to be divertet to Lake Zervreila at the level of its dam.

A popular hike starts at Zervreila, passes the three remote lakes Guraletschsee, Amperveilsee and Selvasee and descends via Selva Alp to Vals. Vals is famous for its spa, designed by Peter Zumthor.

References

Lakes of Graubünden
Lakes of Switzerland
Vals, Switzerland
Tourist attractions in Switzerland
LGuraletschsee